The canton of Auch-2 is an administrative division of the Gers department, southwestern France. It was created at the French canton reorganisation which came into effect in March 2015. Its seat is in Auch.

It consists of the following communes:
 
 Auch (partly)
 Ansan
 Aubiet
 Blanquefort
 L'Isle-Arné
 Juilles
 Lahitte
 Leboulin
 Lussan
 Marsan
 Montégut
 Montiron
 Nougaroulet
 Saint-Caprais

References

Cantons of Gers